Dom is a masculine given name, frequently a short form (hypocorism) of Dominic or Domenic. It may refer to:

People:
 Dom Barry (born 1994), Australian rules footballer
 Dom Capers (born 1950), American National Football League coach
 Dom Cardillo (1930–2013), Canadian politician
 Dom Costa (born 1951), American politician
 Dom DeLuise (1933–2009), American actor and comedian
 Dom DiMaggio (1917–2009), American Major League Baseball player
 Dom Dwyer (born 1990), English footballer
 Dom Enright (1935–2008), Irish hurler
 Dom Flora (born 1935), American former college basketball player
 Dominic Howard (born 1977), drummer for the English rock band Muse
 Dom Joly (born 1967), English television comedian and journalist
 Dom Mariani (born 1958), Australian guitarist, vocalist, producer and songwriter
 Dom Michael (born 1987), Australian cricketer
 Dom O'Donnell, Gaelic footballer from the 1950s to 1970
 Dom Reardon, British comics artist
 Dom Mintoff (1916–2012), Maltese politician, journalist, and architect, former Prime Minister of Malta
 Dom Um Romão (1925–2005), Brazilian jazz drummer and percussionist
 Dom Sheed (born 1995), Australian rules footballer
 Dom Shipperley (born 1991), Australian rugby union footballer
 Dom Sigillo (1913–1957), American National Football League player
 Dom Speakman (born 1994), English rugby league player
 Dom Sullivan (born 1951), Scottish former football player and manager
 Dom Thomas (born 1996), Scottish footballer
 Dom Turner, Australian blues guitarist, vocalist and songwriter for the blues band The Backsliders
 Dom Tyson (born 1993), Australian rules footballer
 Dominic Wood (born 1978), British children's entertainer and TV presenter

Fictional characters:
 Dom Nguyen, in the webcomics MegaTokyo and Okashina Okashi – Strange Candy, inspired by the real-life entertainment writer of the same name
 Dom Perino, in Degrassi: The Next Generation
 Dominic Reilly, in the soap opera Hollyoaks
 Dominic Thompson, in the New Zealand soap opera Shortland Street
 Dominic "Dom" Toretto, in the American action film franchise The Fast and the Furious

Masculine given names
Hypocorisms
English masculine given names